Christian Brothers High School (CBHS) is located in Memphis, Tennessee, at 5900 Walnut Grove Road. It is a Catholic, all-boys college preparatory school which has a Lasallian tradition.

History
In 1963, Christian Brothers accepted Jesse Turner, Jr., making CBHS the first racially integrated high school in Memphis, public or private. Turner graduated as co-salutatorian in 1967.

Notable alumni
Pete Carney – musician 
Ray Crone – Major League Baseball pitcher
Zach Curlin – basketball and football coach for the University of Memphis
Dominic Dierkes – actor, comedian, writer
Logan Forsythe – MLB second baseman
Paul Hofer – NFL running back
Phil Irwin – Major League Baseball pitcher
Mike Jankowski – skiing and snowboarding coach
Bill Justis – recording artist, music producer and film composer
Chuck Lanza – NFL player
Nick Marable – freestyle wrestler, represented Team USA at the 2014 World Wrestling Championships
Tim McCarver – Major League Baseball player and Ford C. Frick Award winner for New York Mets and Fox Sports
Shaun Micheel – professional golfer
Cary Middlecoff – dentist and professional golfer
Anthony Miller – NFL wide receiver
Lawrence "Boo" Mitchell – musician
Richard Mulrooney – professional soccer player
John J. Shea, Jr. – ear surgeon
Jim Strickland – politician, Mayor of Memphis

Jesse Winchester – musician, songwriter

References

External links

Christian Brothers High School, Memphis, TN
Tennessee Secondary School Athletics Association

1871 establishments in Tennessee
Boys' schools in Tennessee
Catholic secondary schools in Tennessee
Christian Brothers University
Educational institutions established in 1871
Lasallian schools in the United States
Roman Catholic Diocese of Memphis
Preparatory schools in Tennessee
Schools in Memphis, Tennessee